The 1994–95 UEFA Cup was won by Parma on aggregate over Juventus. Internazionale were the defending champions with a wild card, but were knocked out in the first round by Aston Villa.

New format
Twenty-two national champions were demoted to the UEFA Cup after the locking of the Champions League. Following the final extinction of two historic countries, Yugoslavia and East Germany, nation 9 and nation 10 obtained a third slot, and England obtained this prize. Wales took the place of usually retired Albania. Czechoslovakia split between Czech Republic and Slovakia. The Faroe Islands and Israel had their own slot. A preliminary round would reduce the 91 clubs to the usual 64.

Teams
The labels in the parentheses show how each team qualified for the place of its starting round:
 TH: Title holders
 LC: League Cup winners
 Nth: League position

Preliminary round

|}

First leg

Second leg

Anorthosis Famagusta won 4–1 on aggregate.

Aris Thessaloniki won 5–2 on aggregate.

ÍA won 4–1 on aggregate.

Kispesti Honvéd won 5–1 on aggregate.

Rosenborg won 8–1 on aggregate.

Aarau won 2–0 on aggregate.

Dinamo Minsk won 6–5 on aggregate.

Dinamo Tbilisi won 4–1 on aggregate.

FC Copenhagen won 4–1 on aggregate.

Fenerbahçe won 7–0 on aggregate.

Linfield won 3–2 on aggregate.

MyPa won 3–1 on aggregate.

Békéscsabai Elõre won 2–1 on aggregate.

Trelleborg won 4–2 on aggregate.

Górnik Zabrze won 8–0 on aggregate.

Apollon Limassol won 8–3 on aggregate.

Lillestrøm won 4–3 on aggregate.

Motherwell won 7–1 on aggregate.

Odense BK won 6–0 on aggregate.

Olimpija Ljubljana won 5–3 on aggregate.

CSKA Sofia won 3–0 on aggregate.

Slovan Bratislava won 5–0 on aggregate.

AIK won 4–0 on aggregate.

Slavia Prague won 6–0 on aggregate.

1–1 on aggregate; Skonto won on away goals.

GKS Katowice won 8–0 on aggregate.

Rapid București won 7–3 on aggregate.

First round

|}

First leg

UEFA invalidated this game and awarded a 3–0 win to Juventus because CSKA fielded an ineligible player, Petar Mihtarski.

Second leg

2–2 on aggregate; AIK won on away goals.

Athletic Bilbao won 3–2 on aggregate.

Sion won 4–3 on aggregate.

Cannes won 9–1 on aggregate.

Bayer Leverkusen won 5–4 on aggregate.

Trelleborg won 3–2 on aggregate.

Boavista won 3–2 on aggregate.

Borussia Dortmund won 3–0 on aggregate.

Marítimo won 1–0 on aggregate.

Lazio won 4–1 on aggregate.

Tirol Innsbruck won 5–2 on aggregate.

Bordeaux won 5–1 on aggregate.

Tekstilshchik Kamyshin won 6–2 on aggregate.

Kispesti Honvéd won 5–4 on aggregate.

1–1 on aggregate; GKS Katowice won 4–3 on penalties.

Kaiserslautern won 8–1 on aggregate.

1–1 on aggregate; Aston Villa won 4–3 on penalties.

Odense BK won 6–1 on aggregate.

Napoli won 3–0 on aggregate.

Eintracht Frankfurt won 3–1 on aggregate.

Marseille won 5–1 on aggregate.

Juventus won 8–1 on aggregate.

Newcastle United won 10–2 on aggregate.

4–4 on aggregate; Dynamo Moscow won on away goals.

Rapid București won 3–2 on aggregate.

2–2 on aggregate; Real Madrid won on away goals.

Deportivo de La Coruña won 4–2 on aggregate.

Nantes won 5–3 on aggregate.

Slovan Bratislava won 2–1 on aggregate.

Trabzonspor won 5–4 on aggregate.

Admira Wacker won 6–3 on aggregate.

Parma won 2–1 on aggregate.

Second round

|}

First leg

Second leg

1–1 on aggregate; Odense BK won on away goals.

Parma won 3–0 on aggregate.

Napoli won 3–2 on aggregate.

Bayer Leverkusen won 7–0 on aggregate.

Juventus won 3–1 on aggregate.

Real Madrid won 6–2 on aggregate.

Nantes won 4–1 on aggregate.

3–3 on aggregate; Sion won on away goals.

Deportivo de La Coruña won 4–2 on aggregate.

GKS Katowice won 2–1 on aggregate.

3–3 on aggregate; Athletic Bilbao won on away goals.

Eintracht Frankfurt won 6–2 on aggregate.

Borussia Dortmund won 4–2 on aggregate.

2–2 on aggregate; Trabzonspor won on away goals.

Lazio won 1–0 on aggregate.

Admira Wacker won 5–3 on aggregate.

Third round

|}

First leg

Second leg

Parma won 4–3 on aggregate.

Borussia Dortmund won 3–2 on aggregate.

Eintracht Frankfurt won 2–0 on aggregate.

Nantes won 6–2 on aggregate.

Bayer Leverkusen won 8–1 on aggregate.

Odense BK won 4–3 on aggregate.

Lazio won 4–2 on aggregate.

Juventus won 5–2 on aggregate.

Quarter-finals

|}

First leg

Second leg

Bayer Leverkusen won 5–1 on aggregate.

Juventus won 4–1 on aggregate.

Parma won 1–0 on aggregate.

Borussia Dortmund won 2–1 on aggregate.

Semi-finals

|}

First leg

Second leg

Parma won 5–1 on aggregate.

Juventus won 4–3 on aggregate.

Final

First leg

Second leg

Parma won 2–1 on aggregate.

Top scorers

See also
1994–95 UEFA Champions League

External links
1994–95 All matches UEFA Cup – season at UEFA website
Official Site
Results at RSSSF.com
 All scorers 1994–95 UEFA Cup according to (excluding preliminary round) according to protocols UEFA + all scorers preliminary round
1994/95 UEFA Cup – results and line-ups (archive)

 
UEFA Cup seasons
2